The 2015–16 UMKC Kangaroos women's basketball team represents the University of Missouri–Kansas City during the 2015–16 NCAA Division I women's basketball season. The Kangaroos are led by coach Marsha Frese. They will play most of their home games at the Swinney Recreation Center, with two taking place at Municipal Auditorium. UMKC entered the season as members of the Western Athletic Conference. They finished the season 10–18, 5–9 in WAC play to finish sixth place. They lost in the quarterfinals of the WAC women's tournament to Utah Valley.

Roster

Schedule
Source:

|-
!colspan=9 style=""| Exhibition

|-
!colspan=9 style=""| Non-conference regular season

|-
!colspan=9 style=""| WAC regular season

|-
!colspan=9 style=""|

See also
 2015–16 UMKC Kangaroos men's basketball team

References

Kansas City Roos women's basketball seasons
UMKC